Lawrence Ofori (born 28 June 1998) is a Ghanaian professional footballer who plays as a midfielder for Portuguese club Moreirense on loan from Famalicão.

Career
Ofori has played for West African Football Academy, Leixões, Feirense and Famalicão. In February 2022 he moved on loan to Ashod.

For the 2022–23 season, Ofori was loaned to Moreirense in Liga Portugal 2.

References

1998 births
Living people
Ghanaian footballers
West African Football Academy players
Leixões S.C. players
C.D. Feirense players
F.C. Famalicão players
F.C. Arouca players
F.C. Ashdod players
Moreirense F.C. players
Ghana Premier League players
Liga Portugal 2 players
Primeira Liga players
Israeli Premier League players
Association football midfielders
Ghanaian expatriate footballers
Ghanaian expatriate sportspeople in Portugal
Expatriate footballers in Portugal
Ghanaian expatriate sportspeople in Israel
Expatriate footballers in Israel